New Jersey (SSN-796) is a nuclear powered -class attack submarine and will be the third U.S. Navy vessel named for the state of New Jersey. Secretary of the Navy Ray Mabus announced the name on 25 May 2015, at a ceremony in Jersey City, New Jersey.

New Jerseys construction reached pressure hull completion in February 2021. The construction milestone signifies that all of the submarine’s hull sections have been joined to form a single, watertight unit. She was christened on 13 November 2021 and launched on 14 April 2022. New Jersey is the first US Navy attack submarine designed for a mixed-gender crew.

New Jersey is expected to be delivered to the Navy late in 2022, and should be commissioned shortly after.

Ship’s Crest

New Jerseys crest features the submarine in the foreground with the battleship  in the background, surmounted by the motto, "Virtute Ignis Pro Libertas". This is a Latin translation of "Firepower for Freedom", which was also the battleship’s motto. On the side is the outline of the State of New Jersey with a portion of the famous painting Washington Crossing the Delaware set inside the borders. The references to Washington’s victory at Trenton and to the battleship New Jersey are meant to show that the submarine is the heir to a long tradition. The devil horns, tail, and wings on the outside of the crest are a reference to the Jersey Devil, the legendary creature said to inhabit the Pine Barrens.

References

 

Virginia-class submarines
Submarines of the United States Navy
Submarines of the United States